Louis Fabry was a French astronomer who was born in Marseille, April 20, 1862, and died in Les Lecques, January 26, 1939.

Biography 
Louis Fabry was born in 1862 to a Provençal family with five boys. His brothers Charles, Eugène and Auguste were, respectively, a physicist, a mathematician and a magistrate.

From childhood he showed a keen taste for astronomy and mathematics. He joined the École Polytechnique in 1880, before his brother Eugène and five years before his brother Charles.

After receiving his licenciate, he became a student in the school of astronomy that Admiral Mouchez had just opened at the Paris Observatory. He was then sent to the Nice Observatory and remained there until 1890. It was during his stay in Nice he married and became widowed a few months after.

Back in his hometown, he joined the Marseille Observatory where he was promoted to assistant astronomer in 1895. He remained there until his retirement in 1924.

References
 "Louis Fabry (1862-1939)", Jean Bosler, Ciel et Terre 56 (1940), pp. 36–39, .
 "Fabry, Louis", Jacques R. Lévy, Complete Dictionary of Scientific Biography, Charles Scribner's Sons, 2008.
  "Notice nécrologique sur L. Fabry", Gaston Fayet, Comptes rendus hebdomadaires des séances de l'Académie des sciences, 208 (1939), pp. 545–547.

1862 births
1939 deaths
19th-century French astronomers
École Polytechnique alumni
20th-century French astronomers